Sergio Alfonso Rodríguez Aguilera (born November 26, 1995) is a Mexican professional footballer who currently plays for Tritones Vallarta. He made his professional debut with Atlas during a Copa MX draw against Coras de Nayarit on 26 January 2016, and played his first Liga MX match in September.

References

External links
 

1995 births
Living people
Mexican footballers
Association football forwards
Atlas F.C. footballers
Alebrijes de Oaxaca players
C.D. Tepatitlán de Morelos players
Mineros de Zacatecas players
Tritones Vallarta M.F.C. footballers
Chihuahua F.C. footballers
Liga MX players
Ascenso MX players
Liga de Expansión MX players
Liga Premier de México players
Tercera División de México players
Footballers from Aguascalientes
People from Aguascalientes City